Van Zant or VanZant or Vanzant may refer to:

People
 Charles Van Zant (born 1943), American politician
 Dennis Van Zant (born 1952), American basketball player
 Dick Van Zant (1864–1912), American baseball player
 Iyanla Vanzant (born 1953), American author and inspirational speaker
 Jimmie Van Zant (1956–2016), American singer-songwriter
 Paige VanZant (born 1994), American mixed martial artist
 Shawn Vanzant (born 1988), American basketball player
 Van Zant (band), an American music duo and family of musicians
 Johnny Van Zant (born 1960), American musician, member of Lynyrd Skynyrd
 Ronnie Van Zant (1948–1977), American musician, member of Lynyrd Skynyrd
 Donnie Van Zant (born 1952), American musician, member of .38 Special

Places
 Vanzant, Kentucky, an unincorporated community in the United States
 Vanzant, Missouri, an unincorporated community in the United States

See also
Vansant (disambiguation)
Van Sant (disambiguation)
Van Zandt (disambiguation)